The 1981 Segunda División de Chile was the 30th season of the Segunda División de Chile.

Deportes Arica was the tournament's champion.

Table

See also
Chilean football league system

References

External links
 RSSSF 1981

Segunda División de Chile (1952–1995) seasons
Primera B
Chil